The Little Mécatina River is a major river in the Côte-Nord region of the provinces of Labrador and Quebec, Canada. Studies have been made to exploit the hydroelectric potential of the river, which could be around 1,200 MW from three dams. The Little Mécatina River was driven first with kayaks by Rolf Theiß and Fritz Gottensrtöter from Guetersloh, Germany ( 13.8.- 6.9.1973 ).

Location

The river has a Strahler number of 7.
It originates to the east of Lake Aticonac near the border between the Atlantic and Saint Lawrence Basins.
This is along the border between Quebec and Newfoundland claimed by Quebec, well north of the border defined in 1927 by the Privy Council.
It flows through the unorganized territories of Lac-Jérôme and Petit-Mécatina.
It winds in a generally south-east direction, then turns south and empties into the Gulf of St. Lawrence a short distance west of Little Mecatina Island.

The mouth of the river is in the municipality of Côte-Nord-du-Golfe-du-Saint-Laurent in Le Golfe-du-Saint-Laurent Regional County Municipality.
The proposed Harrington Harbour Biodiversity Reserve would lie in the river's watershed.

Name

The Innu call the river Nataukamiu Hipu, or "river with broken waters".
In Naskapi it is called Kuekuatsheunekap Shipu, or "wolverine river".
Mécatina comes from the Innu language term makatinau, meaning "large mountain".
The meaning in the Cree language is either "red mountain" or "large mountain".
In 1694 Louis Jolliet used the term Mecatinachis for the island of Little Mécatina.
Jean-Baptiste-Louis Franquelin used "Petit Mécatina" to identify the river in 1699.

The qualifiers Petit and Gros (Small and Big) were used to distinguish two trading posts in the 18th century.
On 20 September 1739 Jean-Baptiste Pommereau was granted a concession for the Gros Mécatinat, and on 15 January 1740 the intendant Gilles Hocquart granted Henri-Albert de Saint-Vincent seven or eight leagues of shoreline at Petit Mecatina.
The names of the rivers that led inland from these trading posts were translated as the Big Mecatina River (Rivière du Gros Mécatina) and Little Mecatina River (Rivière du Petit Mécatina) by the English.

Fishing

In 2017 all salmon, large and small, had to be released on the Malbaie (Gaspé Peninsula), Pigou, Bouleau, Magpie, Coacoachou, Nétagamiou, Little Mécatina and Véco rivers. 
Only young salmon could be retained on 51 rivers, and limited retention of large salmon was allowed on 19 rivers.

Hydrology

About 56.2% of the basin is in Labrador north of the provincial boundary.
The river floods during the spring thaw, flow is reduced in summer, rises again in fall, then drops to a minimum in winter.

Hydroelectric potential

Hydro-Québec has been considering a project to build a new 1,200 MW hydroelectric complex on the river, which has potential to host several dams.
Just after work started on the Romaine River complex, in 2009 Prime Minister Jean Charest asked Hydro-Québec to start studies of developing the Little Mécatina River.
The project, which would flood , would require consent by the La Romaine Band Council.
Although studies began in 2002, as of 2011 the Innu had been given little information.
The Quebec Prime Minister François Legault said during his 2018 election campaign that he wanted to start a major hydroelectric project during his time in office, and in November 2018 he met with Ontario premier Doug Ford to discuss sale of electricity to Ontario.
Eric Martel, CEO of Hydro-Québec, said "I can easily see that in 2021-2022 we will have make a decision to perhaps build something that would be ready in 2038, 2039 or 2040."
The proposal is for three dams, which would be ready after the present surplus of electricity had ended.

Notes

Sources

	

 

Rivers of Côte-Nord